Compsoctena melitoplaca is a moth in the family Eriocottidae. It was described by Edward Meyrick in 1927. It is found in South Africa.

References

Moths described in 1927
Compsoctena
Lepidoptera of South Africa